Cherry Beach (originally Clarke Beach Park) is a lakeside beach park located at the foot of Cherry Street just south of Unwin Avenue in Toronto, Ontario, Canada. It is on Toronto's outer harbour just east of the Eastern Gap. It was once connected with Toronto Islands as part of the former peninsula before 1852 and later was referred to as Fisherman's Island.

Despite its location at the tip of Toronto's formerly heavily industrial Port Lands area, Cherry Beach has still been a popular gathering place for years. There is no boardwalk or proper picnic area, and much of the surrounding areas is marshland or leftover grounds from what was once commercial industry and factory grounds. Recently the park has undergone improvements which includes a paved entranceway and a renovated washroom and swimming change room facilities.

In summer, the beach water is generally calm, and slightly warmer than other Toronto beaches along the lake shore, as its shallow water is sheltered by the Leslie Street Spit from direct surges of Lake Ontario. However, there are extensive growths of seaweed underwater that degrade the swimming experience.

History

It was originally named Clarke Beach Park after Harry Clarke, a Toronto alderman who was responsible for creating the park in the early 1930s. In 2003, the city changed it to Cherry Beach which is the local common name.

For many years it was one of the few Toronto beaches that was clean enough for swimming, windsurfing and kitesurfing. It has change rooms for bathers and barbecue areas for picnickers. It also has an off-leash area for dog walkers. The Martin Goodman Trail passes through the park.

Cherry Beach Sports Fields
A wooded area by the beach has been turned into soccer fields, children's play structure and a metered parking area.

In 2006 a pair of soccer fields were completed on land that had formerly been part of the greenbelt, at 275 Unwin Avenue.
The fields were surfaced in astroturf and built to FIFA standards, and games of the 2007 FIFA Jr championship were to be played there.
During the environmental assessment the site was found to be heavily contaminated by heavy metals, hydrocarbons and PCBs.
The soccer field was described as a "transitional" facility, as most of the land on either side of Unwin was underutilized city land that could be repurposed to sport facilities even though it was contaminated.

Toronto FC used the soccer pitches for practice while their own dedicated training facilities were being constructed at Downsview Park.

In popular culture
Pukka Orchestra had a local radio hit in 1984 with the song "Cherry Beach Express". The song is about an urban legend that Toronto police used Cherry Beach as a location to beat suspects. The police tried to have the song banned.

Parts of the music video for the Alessia Cara song "Wild Things" were filmed at Cherry Beach.

Parts of the film Silent Hill: Revelation 3D were filmed at Cherry Beach.

Toronto punk band Career Suicide named a 2008 EP after Cherry Beach.

See also
 Port Lands
 Waterfront Trail

References

External links

Cherry Beach location and current swimming conditions

Beaches of Toronto
Parks in Toronto